Badby Wood is a  biological Site of Special Scientific Interest (SSSI) south of Badby in Northamptonshire.

This is ancient semi-natural woodland on acidic soils, and it has been forested for over 700 years. It is mainly pedunculate oak, with varied ground flora including creeping soft-grass, wood anemone, yellow archangel and bluebell. A small marsh has very diverse herbs.

There is access by footpaths from Badby. Much of the eastern half of the wood falls outside the SSSI.

References

Sites of Special Scientific Interest in Northamptonshire